Travis Rettenmaier (born August 6, 1983) is a former American professional tennis player. Rettenmaier's highest singles ranking was World No. 273 achieved on February 27, 2006. In doubles, his ranking was World No. 57, which he achieved on July 12, 2010. He was mainly active as a doubles player.

Rettenmaier in 2022 became the first owner/player of a Major League Pickleball team. As a co-owner of the Florida Smash (www.floridasmash.com) Rettenmaier made the finals of the first event at Dreamland in Dripping Springs, Texas.  Rettenmaier played alongside JW Johnson, Lee Whitwell and Maggy Remynse.

Rettenmaier is the highest ranked ATP player to play pickleball with a previous ranking of #57 reached in 2010. Rettenmaier now is a full time professional pickleball player with an intense interest in the growth and business of pickleball.

Career
Rettenmaier, coached by former touring pro Scott McCain, turned professional in 2002 and retired in 2012.

At 6-foot 2-inches, Rettenmaier was a right-hander. He was 2–2 on the ATP Tour in singles matches, and 16–28 in doubles.

Personal life
Travis is the son of Tom and Karen Rettenmaier, and has one sister named Bettina. He started tennis when he was one, and enjoys hard and grass courts best. Aside from tennis, Rettenmaier enjoys basketball, golf, and ping-pong.

He entered UCLA at age 16 and competed for two years for the UCLA Bruins before turning pro.

Rettenmaier now resides in Saint Petersburg, Florida with his daughter Rowyn.

ATP career finals

Doubles: 2 (1 title, 1 runner-up)

ATP Challenger and ITF Futures finals

Singles: 4 (2–2)

Doubles: 39 (27–12)

External links
 
 

American male tennis players
UCLA Bruins men's tennis players
People from Tarzana, Los Angeles
Tennis players from Los Angeles
1983 births
Living people